Daniel Faris (born 2 May 1987) is a Lebanese-American basketball player who plays for Champville SC and .

College career
Faris played four years of NCAA Division I basketball at the University of New Mexico. In his senior season, he averaged 12.1 points and 6.4 rebounds per game en route to being named to the All-Mountain West Conference second team.

Professional career
After his college career, Daniel Faris played for the West-Brabant Giants, for sponsorship reasons WCAA Giants, in the Dutch Basketball League (DBL) for one year. With the Giants, he reached the finals of the 2009–10 DBL season. After finishing his season in the Dutch league, Faris signed with Lebanese powerhouse Hekmeh in the Lebanese Basketball League, he only played two games with the team in 2012.

In 2016, he signed with Champville SC in Lebanon.

International career
Faris is also a member of the Lebanon national basketball team. He competed with the senior team for the first time at the FIBA Asia Championship 2009, where he saw action in four games for the fourth-place Lebanese team.

References

1987 births
Living people
American expatriate basketball people in the Netherlands
American men's basketball players
American people of Lebanese descent
Basketball players from California
Basketball players from New Mexico
Dutch Basketball League players
Lebanese men's basketball players
New Mexico Lobos men's basketball players
People from Greenbrae, California
Sportspeople from the San Francisco Bay Area
West-Brabant Giants players
Power forwards (basketball)
Sagesse SC basketball players
Sportspeople of Lebanese descent